Sobakhiyeh (also Romanized as Şobākhīyeh; also known as Şabbāḩīyeh) is a village in Jaffal Rural District, in the Central District of Shadegan County, Khuzestan Province, Iran. At the 2006 census, its population was 29, in 5 families.

References 

Populated places in Shadegan County